Kaiyuan Temple is a Buddhist temple located in Xiangqiao District of Chaozhou, Guangdong, China.

After ascending the throne in 713, Emperor Xuanzong issued the decree building "Kaiyuan Temples" which was named after his reign title "Kaiyuan" in each prefecture of the Tang Empire (618–907). Through the rise and fall in the Tang, Song, Yuan, Ming and Qing dynasties, most of the present structures of Kaiyuan Temple still preserves the original appearance include several national treasures.

History
Kaiyuan temple was first established in 738, in the reign of Emperor Xuanzong of Tang dynasty (618–907) with the original name of "Lifeng Temple". The name was changed to "Kaiyuan Wanshou Chan Temple" during the Yuan dynasty (1172–1638). And then it was renamed "Kaiyuan Zhenguo Chan Temple" in the Ming dynasty (1368–1644). During the Qing dynasty (1644–1911), people usually called it "Kaiyuan Temple" which is still use now.

In 1950, Buddhist monk Chunxin was elected as the new abbot of the temple. Under his leadership, the temple was refurbished and redecorated. In 1962, Kaiyuan Temple was categorized as a provincial level key cultural heritage by the Guangdong Provincial Government. During the ten years devastating Cultural Revolution, the resident monks were being to disrobe and return to secular life, the abbot died in countryside.

After the 3rd Plenary Session of the 11th Central Committee of the Chinese Communist Party, according to the national policy of free religious belief, Buddhist monk Huiyuan was unanimously chosen as abbot of the temple. He headed the reconstruction project. The reconstruction of the project lasted six years. In 1983, Kaiyuan Temple was classified as a National Key Buddhist Temple in Han Chinese Area.

In 1991, Buddhist monk Dingran was elected as abbot. During his term in the position, Thai Chinese, Upasika Xie Huiru donated property to establish a Thailand style Buddhist Hall known as "Taifo Hall" ( with a Buddha image of Maravijaya attitude enshrined in the hall.

On June 25, 2001, Kaiyuan Temple was listed among the fifth group of "Major National Historical and Cultural Sites in Guangdong" by the State Council of China.

Architecture

Along the central axis are the Shanmen, Four Heavenly Kings Hall, Mahavira Hall and Buddhist Texts Library.  The other buildings include Dabei Hall, Taifo Hall, abbot's hall, dining hall, wing-rooms, etc.

Mahavira Hall
The Mahavira Hall enshrining the statues of Sakyamuni (middle), Amitabha (west) and Bhaisajyaguru (east). The statues of Eighteen Arhats stand on both sides of the hall.

Dabei Hall

The Babei Hall was built in 2005. The construction took five years, and lasted from 2000 to 2005. Under the eaves is a plaque with the Chinese characters "Dabei Hall" written by Hong Kong sinologist Jao Tsung-I. A total of 86 statues of Guanyin are enshrined in the hall.

Taifo Hall

A bronze statue of Gautama Buddha in Maravijaya attitude is enshrined in the Taifo Hall. On the walls of the hall are painting with stories of Prince Siddhartha attaining Enlightenment in Thai artwork style. The statue of Phra Phrom, also known as "Four-faced Brahma", stands in the east side.

National treasures

Thousand Buddha Pagoda
The Eighteen Arhats and Twenty-four Gods and Kings are carved on the body of the pagoda.

Bronze bell
It was cast in 1114 in the reign of Emperor Huizong of Northern Song dynasty.

Stone pillars
Kaiyuan Temple houses four stone pillars, they were made in the Tang dynasty (618–907). They are decorated with relief carvings of the Buddha, lotus petals, Hercules, Buddhist texts, and other designs.

Banisters
The banisters of the Mahavira Hall are carved with stories of Sakyamuni's becoming monk and other patterns, they were made in the Tang dynasty (618–907).

Xianglu

Kaiyuan Temple collected two Xianglu. One was cast by Korean monk in the Kaiyuan period (713–741) of Tang dynasty (618–907). The other was cast in 1325 by Yuan dynasty (1271–1368) politician Xu Zhenjin.

Yunban
The Yunban in 1346, during the 6th year of Zhizheng period (1341–1370) of the Yuan dynasty (1271–1368).

Dragon-store Canon
A set of Dragon-store Buddhist Canon which printed in the Qianlong era (1376–1796) of the Qing dynasty (1644–1911) are preserved in Kaiyuan Temple. The Buddhist Canon was printed by imperial government and only 100 copies were produced at that time.

References

Bibliography
 

Buildings and structures in Chaozhou
Tourist attractions in Chaozhou
8th-century establishments in China
8th-century Buddhist temples
Buddhist temples in Chaozhou